El Willy is a Spanish restaurant in Shanghai, China. It opened in January 2008 and is operated by chef Willy Trullas Moreno, who is from Spain. The restaurant relocated from a colonial house in Shanghai's French concession to a space in The Bund in 2012.

See also
 List of Spanish restaurants

External links 
Official website 
Facebook page

References 

Restaurants in Shanghai
Spanish restaurants
Culture in Shanghai
Restaurants established in 2008